Shadowrun is a pen and paper role-playing game, first released in 1989.

Shadowrun may also refer to:
 Video games based on the role-playing game:
 Shadowrun (1993 video game), a 1993 video game for the Super NES
 Shadowrun (1994 video game), a 1994 video game for the Sega Genesis
 Shadowrun (1996 video game), a 1996 video game for the Sega Mega-CD
 Shadowrun (2007 video game), a 2007 game for the Xbox 360 and Windows Vista
 Shadowrun Returns, a 2013 game for Windows, OS X and Linux, iOS and Android
 Shadowrun: Dragonfall, a 2014 game for Windows, OS X, Linux, iOS and Android
 Shadowrun Chronicles: Boston Lockdown, a 2015 game for Linux, Windows, OS X, Android, iOS and Ouya
 Shadowrun: Hong Kong, a 2015 game for Windows, OS X, Linux
 Shadowrun: The Trading Card Game, a 1997 collectible card game
 Shadowrun Duels, a 2003 collectible miniatures game
 Other uses:
 Shadow Run (film), a 1998 crime film based on the novel The Shadow Run